During the 1910–11 English football season, Brentford competed in the Southern League First Division. Despite contending for promotion during the first half of the season, injuries dropped the Bees to a mid-table finish.

Season summary

A £315 loss on the 1909–10 season meant that there was little transfer activity for Brentford manager Fred Halliday to conduct over the course of the 1910 off-season, with half back George Kennedy, full back John Christie and returning outside right Joe Ryalls being the only signings of note. The Bees had a good first half of the Southern League First Division season, losing just five of the opening 20 matches, with Geordie Reid (Southern League XI) and Steve Buxton and John Christie (both London XI) winning representative honours. Despite the promising form, the majority of the team's goals were scored by Reid, who bagged 14 goals in a 17-match spell.  

Brentford's promotion challenge was effectively ended by a 3–0 defeat to Swindon Town (champions at the end of the season) on 7 January 1911 and the team slipped from 5th position into mid-table. Injuries to George Kennedy, Joe Ryalls, Geordie Reid and George Anderson at differing times disrupted the attack and Brentford finished the season having scored 41 league goals, with Geordie Reid having scored over half the team's total (21), which equalled Adam Bowman's club record for most Southern League goals in a season. Some pride was salvaged with victory over West London rivals Queens Park Rangers in the inaugural Ealing Hospital Cup in April.

League table

Results
Brentford's goal tally listed first.

Legend

Southern League First Division

FA Cup

 Source: 100 Years Of Brentford

Playing squad 
Players' ages are as of the opening day of the 1910–11 season.

 Source: 100 Years Of Brentford, Football League Players' Records 1888 to 1939

Coaching staff

Statistics

Appearances and goals

Players listed in italics left the club mid-season.
Source: 100 Years Of Brentford

Goalscorers 

Players listed in italics left the club mid-season.
Source: 100 Years Of Brentford

Management

Summary

Transfers & loans

References 

Brentford F.C. seasons
Brentford